Three Men from Texas is a 1940 American Western film directed by Lesley Selander, written by Norton S. Parker, and starring William Boyd, Russell Hayden, Andy Clyde, Morris Ankrum, Morgan Wallace, Thornton Edwards and Esther Estrella. It was released on November 15, 1940, Paramount Pictures.

Plot

Cast 
 William Boyd as Hopalong Cassidy
 Russell Hayden as Lucky Jenkins
 Andy Clyde as California Carlson
 Morris Ankrum as Bruce Morgan
 Morgan Wallace as Texas Ranger Captain Andrews
 Thornton Edwards as Pico Serrano
 Esther Estrella as Paquita Serrano
 Davison Clark as Ed Thompson
 Dick Curtis as Gardner
 George Lollier as Henchman Dave
 Glenn Strange as Ben Stokes
 Neyle Morrow as Juanito

References

External links 
 
 
 
 

1940 films
American black-and-white films
1940s English-language films
Films scored by Victor Young
Films directed by Lesley Selander
Paramount Pictures films
American Western (genre) films
1940 Western (genre) films
Hopalong Cassidy films
1940s American films